Pisgah High School is a middle and high school in Sand Hill, Mississippi, in the Jackson metropolitan area. It is a part of the Rankin County School District.  it had over 380 students. The principal is Craig Yates.

References

External links
 

Public high schools in Mississippi
Public middle schools in Mississippi
Schools in Rankin County, Mississippi